Sandoa Airport  is an airstrip serving the city of Sandoa in Lualaba Province, Democratic Republic of the Congo.

See also

 Transport in the Democratic Republic of the Congo
 List of airports in the Democratic Republic of the Congo

References

External links
 OpenStreetMap - Sandoa
 HERE Maps - Sandoa
 OurAirports - Sandoa
 FallingRain - Sandoa

Airports in Lualaba Province